Haidee Maree Tiffen  (born 4 September 1979) is a New Zealand cricket coach and former cricket player. She played as an all-rounder, batting right-handed and bowling right-arm medium. She appeared in 2 Test matches, 117 One Day Internationals and 9 Twenty20 Internationals for New Zealand between 1999 and 2009. She played domestic cricket for Canterbury, as well as playing two seasons for Sussex.

Tiffen was born in Timaru on 4 September 1979 and attended Timaru Girls' High School, where she was head girl in 1997.

Once acknowledged as one of the best all-rounders in the game, Tiffen announced her retirement after leading her side to the final of the 2009 Women's Cricket World Cup.  At that time, her 2,919 career ODI runs were surpassed by only six other women, and for New Zealand only Debbie Hockley exceeded her.  She was short-listed for the ICC Women's Player of the Year Award in 2006, eventually losing out to Karen Rolton.

Tiffen was appointed a Member of the New Zealand Order of Merit in the 2011 New Year Honours, for services to women's cricket.

She was head coach for New Zealand women's team from April 2015 to March 2019.

References

External links
 
 

1979 births
Living people
Cricketers from Timaru
People educated at Timaru Girls' High School
New Zealand women cricketers
New Zealand women cricket captains
New Zealand women Test cricketers
New Zealand women One Day International cricketers
New Zealand women Twenty20 International cricketers
Canterbury Magicians cricketers
Sussex women cricketers
Members of the New Zealand Order of Merit
Female sports coaches
New Zealand cricket coaches
New Zealand expatriate sportspeople in England